Tenyiphe I is a village located in the Chümoukedima District of Nagaland and is a suburb of Chümoukedima, the district headquarters.

Demographics
Tenyiphe I is situated in the Chümoukedima District of Nagaland. As per the Population Census 2011, there are a total 612 households in Tenyiphe I. The total population of Tenyiphe I is 3037.

See also
Chümoukedima District

References

Villages in Chümoukedima district